Ponta Preta (Portuguese meaning the black point) is a headland located in the southwest of the island of Maio, Cape Verde. It is 1 km southeast of the town Porto Inglês.

References 

Headlands of Cape Verde
Geography of Maio, Cape Verde